Luque may refer to:
Luque, a city in Central Department, Paraguay
Luque, Spain, a city in Spanish province of Córdoba

People
Luque is a surname of Spanish and Portuguese origin and refers to:
Hernando de Luque (d. 1533), Spanish priest
Leopoldo Luque (b. 1949), Argentine football player
Albert Luque (b. 1979), Spanish football player
Eduardo Castro Luque, assassinated Mexican politician
Dolf Luque (1890–1957), former early 20th century Cuban Major League Baseball pitcher
Maria Josep Colomer i Luque (1913–2004), pioneering female pilot from Barcelona
José Juan Luque (b.1977), former Spanish football player
Vicente Luque (b. 1991),  Brazilian mixed martial artist